Ivan Lendl was the defending champion.

Jimmy Connors won the tournament, beating Lendl in the final, 6–4, 3–6, 6–0.

Seeds

  Jimmy Connors (champion)
  Ivan Lendl (final)
  Mats Wilander (quarterfinals)
  Andrés Gómez (semifinals)
  Anders Järryd (first round)
  Tomáš Šmíd (first round)
  Scott Davis (first round)
  Brad Gilbert (first round)

Draw

Finals

Top half

Bottom half

External links
 Main draw

1984 Grand Prix (tennis)
Tokyo Indoor